The Greek women's Volleyball Cup began in the 1998–99 season and is organized by Hellenic Volleyball Federation (ΕΟΠΕ). So far, seven clubs have won the cup. Olympiacos is the most successful club in the competition with 9 titles. AEK are the current cup holders.

Finals

Performance by club

Notes
 That year the cup was interrupted because of violent incidents among the fans of Olympiacos and Panathinaikos.

References

External links
Hellenic Volleyball Federation www.volleyball.gr
Hellenic Volleyball Federation/www.volleyball.gr 
History of Hellenic Women Volleyball Cup www.volleyball.gr - Hellenic Volleyball Federation 

Volleyball in Greece